Welsh School may refer to:

Education in Wales
Welsh School (security studies), or emancipatory realism
Welsh School of Architectural Glass, of Swansea Metropolitan University 
Welsh School of Architecture, of Cardiff University

See also